Commands  (28 September 1996 – 12 July 2014) was an Australian stakes winning racehorse and stallion.

Background

Bred by Arrowfield Stud in the Hunter Region of New South Wales, Commands was a full brother to 5-time Group One winner Danewin.

Racing career

Commands won 4 races in his 15 start career with the highlight being the 1999 Missile Stakes at Rosehill as a two-year-old, beating the older horses at Weight for Age. 

He also ran placings in two Group One races, running third behind Redoute's Choice in the 1999 Caulfield Guineas and a second placing in The Galaxy.

Stud career

Commands was retired to the Inghams' Woodlands Stud and in his first year in 2000 had a service fee of $10,000.  

Darley acquired ownership of Commands in 2008 following the purchase of the Inghams' breeding empire in Australia.  

Commands retired from stallion duties in 2013.  He is the sire of 14 time Group One winner Melody Belle.  Overall he has sired 13 individual Group One winners, and been Australia's "Leading Sire by Winners" on 3 consecutive occasions.

Commands died suddenly on the 12 July 2014 at Darley's Kelvinside property in New South Wales aged 17.

Notable progeny

Commands' Group One winners:

c = colt, f = filly, g = gelding

Pedigree

References 

Racehorses bred in Australia
Racehorses trained in Australia
1996 racehorse births
2014 racehorse deaths
Thoroughbred family 9-c